Judy Martin may refer to:

Judy Martin (politician), Deputy for St Helier District #1, Jersey
Judy Martin (singer) (1917–1951), country music singer and wife of Red Foley
Judy Martin (wrestler) (born 1955), professional wrestler
Judy Martin (horse trainer), Tennessee Walking Horse trainer
Judith Martin (born 1938), writer, also known as "Miss Manners"